Paris Filmes is a film distributor in Brazil which distributes movies on film, DVD and Blu-ray.

Founded in the 1960s by the Romanian immigrant Sandi Adamiu, the company began distributing the films of the French studio Pathé, in Brazil. In the 1980s, the Grupo Paris Filmes acquired "América Vídeo", specializing in action films, distributing major hits on VHS.

In May 2021, it announced the launch in Brazil of Cining, a service that allows cinema networks to create virtual movie theaters. It was created by Carlos Hansen, president and CEO of Chilean film distributor BF Distribution. The following month, Paris Filmes released Midsommar in limited and definitive edition on Blu-ray in partnership with Versátil Home Vídeo. Initially, a print run of 1,000 copies was authorized, then another 500 copies were added to the stock. Due to the contract, the editions were officially sold only on the Versátil Home Vídeo webshop.

In May 2022, it announced the release of 61 Brazilian films that will be released in the country from July 2022 to December 2025.

References

External links
Official website

Companies based in São Paulo
1960 establishments in Brazil